John I of Alençon, known as the Wise (1385 – 25 October 1415), was a French nobleman, killed at the Battle of Agincourt.

John was born in Château d'Essay, the son of Peter II of Alençon and Marie de Chamaillard. In 1404, he succeeded his father as Count of Alençon and Perche. He was made Duke of Alençon in 1414.

He commanded the second division of the French army at the Battle of Agincourt. When the English broke through the first division, he led a countercharge. He is sometimes credited with killing Edward, Duke of York, wounding Humphrey, Duke of Gloucester, and cutting an ornament from the crown of Henry V, King of England. He was overpowered by King Henry's bodyguard and slain before he could yield himself.

Family
In 1396, he married Marie of Brittany (1391–1446), daughter of John IV, Duke of Brittany. They had five children:
 Pierre d'Alençon (1407, Argentan – 1408)
 Jean d'Alençon, Duke of Alençon (1409–1476)
 Marie d'Alençon (1410, Argentan, – 1412, Argentan)
 Jeanne d'Alençon (1412, Argentan – 1420)
 Charlotte d'Alençon (1413, Argentan – 1435, Lamballe)

He also had two illegitimate children:
 Pierre d'Alençon (d. 1424, Battle of Verneuil), Lord of Gallandon
 Marguerite d'Alençon, married Jean de St-Aubin, Lord of Preaux

References

Sources

People of the Hundred Years' War
House of Valois-Alençon
101
Counts of Alençon
Counts of Perche
French military personnel killed in action
John I of Alencon
John I of Alencon
15th-century peers of France